"Bittersweet" is a song by Australian rock group Hoodoo Gurus. It was written by Dave Faulkner, released in June 1985 as the lead single from the group's second studio album, Mars Needs Guitars!. It peaked at number 16 on the Australian charts

In 2000, Dave Faulkner said "... I vowed to myself that I would write less comic narratives and try to express my sentiments in  a more forthright way. I feel I succeeded with 'Bittersweet' though at the time I didn't think that a) the band would want to play it and b) our audience would want to hear it. I was happily wrong on both counts.".

Track listings
 7" single (BTS1503)
 "Bittersweet" (Dave Faulkner) — 3:46
 "Mars Needs Guitars" (James Baker, Clyde Bramley, Faulkner, Mark Kingsmill and Brad Shepherd) — 2:51

Personnel
Credited to:
 James Baker — drums
 Clyde Bramley — bass, backing vocals  
 Dave Faulkner — lead vocals (track A), guitar
 Mark Kingsmill — drums, cymbals
 Brad Shepherd — guitar, lead vocals (track B), harmonica
 Producer — Charles Fisher
 Engineer — John Bee
 Mastering — Don Bartley

Charts

Cover versions & others
Courtney Love provided lead vocals for her band Hole's version of "Bittersweet" with Brad Shepard playing guitar and contributing  backing vocals at Hole's 1999 Big Day Out performance.

References

1985 singles
Hoodoo Gurus songs
1985 songs
Songs written by Dave Faulkner (musician)
Chrysalis Records singles
Elektra Records singles